Markaranka is a locality in the Riverland region of South Australia. It is north of the Murray River near Waikerie, South Australia.

The boundaries were set in September 2000 and adjusted on 26 April 2013 to ensure that Westons Flat pastoral run is entirely in Westons Flat and Glenlock Station is entirely in Markaranka. It lies immediately north of the Goyder Highway midway between Morgan and Barmera.

The southern part of the locality contains some orchards, vineyards and improved pasture. The northern part is unimproved grazing land.

References

Towns in South Australia